Gearlds is both a given name and a surname. Notable people with the name include:

Gearld Wright (1933–2002), American politician
Katie Gearlds (born 1984), American basketball player